Kedar "Bud" Pyatt was Project Orion's chief mathematician. He worked on nuclear physics calculations for the project.

Having a PhD in nuclear physics from Yale University,  he created mathematical models of the processes that were occurring, then setting up equations to simulate those processes and calculate the behavior.

Was born in Louisburg, North Carolina. He was the father of Geoffrey Pyatt, American ambassador to Greece.

References

Living people
20th-century American mathematicians
Yale University alumni
1933 births